The 2008–09 Liga Bet season was the last season of Liga Bet as the fifth tier of the Israeli football league system. The third tier, Liga Artzit was scrapped at the end of the season, making Liga Bet the fourth tier.

The season saw Maccabi Ironi Jatt (champions of the North A division), Maccabi Umm al-Fahm (champions of the North B division), Shimshon Bnei Tayibe (champions of the South A division) and Hapoel Tzafririm Holon (champions of the South B division) winning the title and promotion to Liga Alef.

The runners-up in each division entered a promotion/relegation play-offs, which saw a change of format, as this time, the North runners-up faced each other, as well as the South runners-up, with the winner of each match faced the clubs ranked 12th in Liga Alef North and South divisions respectively, for a decisive matches. Hapoel Daliyat al-Karmel lost to Maccabi Kafr Qara of Liga Alef North and Maccabi Amishav Petah Tikva lost to Hapoel Nahlat Yehuda of Liga Alef South. However, Maccabi Amishav Petah Tikva was eventually promoted to Liga Alef after a vacancy was created in the South division, since Hapoel Umm al-Fahm folded during the summer break.

At the bottom, Bnei Abu Snan, Beitar Kafr Kanna (from North A division), Hapoel Deir el-Asad, Maccabi Sha'ab (from North B division), Hapoel Hod HaSharon, Maccabi Or Yehuda (from South A division), Hapoel F.C. Hevel Modi'in and Hapoel Jaljulia (from South B division) were all automatically relegated to Liga Gimel

North A Division

North B Division

South A Division

South B Division

Promotion play-offs

North play-off
Liga Bet North A and North B runners-up, Hapoel Ahva Haifa and Hapoel Daliyat al-Karmel faced each other. The winner advanced to the decisive play-off match against the 12th placed club in Liga Alef North, Maccabi Kafr Qara.

Hapoel Daliyat al-Karmel qualified for the decisive play-off match against Maccabi Kafr Qara.

Maccabi Kafr Qara remained in Liga Alef.

South play-off
Liga Bet South A and South B runners-up, Maccabi Amishav Petah Tikva and Maccabi Sderot faced each other. The winner advanced to the decisive play-off match against the 12th placed club in Liga Alef North, Hapoel Nahlat Yehuda.

Maccabi Amishav Petah Tikva qualified for the decisive play-off match against Hapoel Nahlat Yehuda.

Hapoel Nahlat Yehuda remained in Liga Alef; Maccabi Amishav Petah Tikva was promoted after Hapoel Umm al-Fahm (which relegated from Liga Artzit to Liga Alef) folded during the summer.

References
 The Israel Football Association 
 The Israel Football Association 
 The Israel Football Association 
 The Israel Football Association 
Promotion/relegation play-offs - Liga Alef livegames.co.il, The Internet Archive 

Liga Bet seasons
5
Israel